C/2013 UQ4 (Catalina) is a Solar System comet that came close to the Earth on July 10, 2014, at a distance of .

Discovery and identification 
The object was discovered on October 23, 2013 by Catalina Sky Survey, in Arizona in the United States. The object, that had an asteroid-like appearance but a comet-like orbit, was named 2013 UQ4. On May 7, 2014, the object was spotted by astronomers A. Novichonok and T. Prystavski with a fuzzy, coma-like aspect, revealing it was indeed a comet (with total brightness 13.5 mag and coma diameter of 1.5'). The object was then given a comet designation of C/2013 UQ4 (Catalina).

Approach to Sun and Earth 
The comet reached its perihelion (the point that is closest to the Sun) on June 5, 2014, and then its perigee (the point that is closest to Earth) on July 10, 2014, at a distance of about 47 million kilometres. The comet peaked around apparent magnitude 9 and was visible in small telescopes. From late July 2014 until March 2015, as seen from Earth, the comet will appear near Arcturus.

References 

20131023
20131023
20140605
20140710